Fatma Nur Yavuz (born 4 January 1997) is a Turkish badminton player. She competed at the 2015 European Games.

Achievements

BWF International Challenge/Series 
Women's doubles

Mixed doubles

  BWF International Challenge tournament
  BWF International Series tournament
  BWF Future Series tournament

References

External links 
 

1997 births
Living people
Sportspeople from Ankara
Turkish female badminton players
Badminton players at the 2015 European Games
European Games competitors for Turkey